Hikiji may refer to:
Hikiji Station (引治駅), a railway station on the Kyūdai Main Line in Kokonoe, Ōita Prefecture, Japan
Hikiji River (引地川), a river in Kanagawa Prefecture, Japan
Miyoko Hikiji, a candidate in the 2016 Iowa Senate election
Lord Hikiji, a power-hungry daimyō in Stan Sakai's Usagi Yojimbo comic

See also
Hijiki, a type of brown seaweed
Hikichi